Unión de Tenerife (also known as Real Unión de Tenerife Tacuense) is a Spanish women's football team based in Tenerife that play in Segunda División Pro. It is the women's section of Real Unión de Tenerife. They were founded in 1998, and currently plays their home matches at the Campo de Fútbol Pablos Abril.

History

In 2002 UD Tacuense promoted to Segunda División. Fourteen seasons later, on 22 June 2016, Tacuense promoted to Primera División. They were relegated again at the end of the 2016–17 Primera División season.

On 12 August 2020, Tacuense merged with Real Unión de Tenerife and was integrated into its structure. In its first season, the main women's squad will play with the name of "Real Unión de Tenerife Tacuense".

Season to season

References

External links
Official website

Women's football clubs in Spain
Football clubs in the Canary Islands
Sport in Tenerife
Association football clubs established in 1998
Segunda Federación (women) clubs
Primera División (women) clubs